is a Japanese animated TV series produced by Sunrise, TV Tokyo and I&S BBDO. It was directed by Hiroshi Matsuzono and Kiyoshi Egami, with Hiroyuki Kawasaki handling series scripts, Yorihisa Uchida designing the characters, Yukihiro Makino designing the mechanical elements and Yasunori Iwasaki composing the music. The series was broadcast by TV Tokyo affiliates on the Monday 5:30PM time slot and aired weekly from April 7 to December 23, 1991, lasting 37 episodes.

Metal Jack was originally planned as a sequel to the live-action tokusatsu show Dennou Keisatsu Cybercop, but due to complications with the show's production, it was made into an animated series instead without any official ties to Cybercop. However, due to low viewership, the length of the show's run was shortened by thirteen episodes. Head writer Hiroyuki Kawasaki would later recycle some of the same situations from Metal Jack in Brave Police J-Decker. The show was also the debut of Nobutoshi Canna (who acted under the birth name of Nobutoshi Hayashi).

Plot
The setting is Tokyo City, one of the world's leading high-tech futuristic cities. In the near future, the world is filled with unprecedented murders, terrorist attacks, and cyber crimes that exceed the limits of what the police can expect. Masanao Daigo of the Tokyo Metropolitan Police Department has been searching for the right people for the "Metal Project," a plan he has been developing for a long time.

One day, an army of Crime Mobiles, monster robots of the criminal organization "Id," appear at a party of the global Zaizen conglomerate and attack Jun Zaizen, the noble son of the conglomerate. Daigo is so impressed by the actions of Ken Kanzaki, a police detective, Ryō Aguri, an F1 racer, and Gō Gōda, a professional wrestler, who were seriously injured in an attempt to save him, that he reanimates them as cyborgs and gives them new bodies and missions as "Metal Jack," an armored police force, to reward their courage in the face of death.

Metal Jack daringly confronts all kinds of crimes. However, Id is always involved in the shadows.

Characters

Metal Jack
 / 

Age 20. A cheerful, but easily irritated officer in the Tokyo Metropolitan Police Department. He was adopted and raised by police officer Genichirō Kanzaki, who met Ryō's biological mother while she was dying in the street. He is an expert marksman whose favorite gun is one that once belonged to his father. After being resurrected, he is forced to keep his membership in the Metal Jack unit a secret from his coworkers, although he eventually reveals his secret to the Chief in Episode 30. Loves his cybernetic police dog Lander. His blood type is a rare RH minus T type. When he undergoes the Hyperization process after he is mortally wounded a second time, his cells develop a high rate of necrosis to compensate for his actual biological origin. He is deeply afraid of snakes.

 / 

Age 23. A snobbish Formula 1 driver full of pride. He dislikes being overly formal to other people and only smiles in the company of close friends. Like Ken, he keeps his occupation as a member of Metal Jack a secret to his friends and family. In Episode 18, it is revealed he doesn't know how to ride a bicycle.

 / 

Age 21. A professional wrestler who aims to become the world's best, his ring name is "Gonzales Gō." He lives in an apartment room in a hospital and is a poor swimmer. Despite being the comic relief of the team, it is him, and not Ken, who ends up developing a romantic relationship with Ken's police partner Eriko.

 / 

Formerly a member of an armed special forces from an unspecified country, he was used as a test subject for the "B Project", where he was subjected into a prototype of the Jack Armor developed by Gilria. He suffered a memory lost as a result of the experiment. His desire to seek revenge has led him to Japan. He is not an actual member of Metal Jack, but always intervenes in their operations by using an old police radio which intercepts the calls between Metal Jack members.

The initiator of the Metal Project and the commander of Metal Jack unit. He has instructed the team to keep their real identities a secret from everyone else, including their friends and families.

A young female scientist who plays an integral role in the second phase of the Metal Project. When Ken is mortally wounded a second time, she initiates the Hyper Project and brings him back to life stronger than before. Despite having many would-be suitors due to her good looks, she is a mechaphile who is more attracted to machines than men.

Friends and relatives

Ken's partner in the MPD. She becomes romantically involved with Gō.

Chief of the MPD's special investigations unit and boss to Ken and Eriko. He was involved in a robotic weapons smuggling case 18 years before the events of the series.

Ken's foster younger sister, who is very close and protective of her older brother. She feels a sense of affection for Jun.

Ken's adoptive father, who was fatally wounded by a convict named Makieda when Ken was 10.

Ken and Sayuri's mother.

Gō's professional wrestling trainer and gym partner.

Id

The leader of Id, a bioroid who resembles an elderly man. He seeks to assassinate Jun, who is later revealed to be his creator.

The second-in-command of Id, a bioroid who resembles a young man. When he learns about his true origin from Megadeth, he becomes driven by revenge and seeks to destroy the entire human race in order to purify the world for bioroids. In Episode 18, it is revealed he is allergic to crabs.

He takes over Id after Megadeth's downfall.

A female android created by Jun, although she is reprogrammed to serve Troidal when Neo Id is formed. Although she is unemotional at first, she gradually develops a sense of affection for Troidal.

Zaizen Group

The young heir of the Zaizen Group. Despite his young age, he is a gifted and highly-intelligent engineer and was in fact the one who constructed Megadeth and Troidal. Later it is revealed that he and Jun are brothers in a sense. In Episode 28, he is brainwashed and becomes the leader of Neo Id.

Chief Secretary of the Zaizen Group. He holds a certain sense of adoration for Jun and always addresses him as "Mr. Jun".

Jun's father and chairman to the Zaizen Group. He is killed during the assassination attempt on his son during the first episode, although many secrets are revealed about him throughout the course of the series.

Criminals

A man who wears mechanical goggles over his eyes and calls himself "The Fangs of Icarus," the name of his organization. He controls a special crystal monster purchased from Id in order to destroy the International Peace Summit. In the novel adaptation, the arms dealer Icarus appears with similar characterization.

A mad scientist who seals off the underground city to take revenge on the world that did not recognize his achievements, and conducts experiments using his life's work, "human population psychology," to induce panic in the people he locks in.

As a result of Id's request to prevent a prosecutorial investigation into the company that would lead to evidence of corruption, a bombing of the Pleiades building by a non-existent bomb monster occurs.

He asks Id to rob the program data held by the AI research center. He is worried about Troidal, who is full of confidence while failing once.

A technical terrorist who was arrested by Ken's father, Genichirō, 10 years ago. Out of resentment, he escapes from prison and breaks into the Kanzaki household. He took the just-born Sayuri as a hostage and mortally wounded Genichirō, but lost his right hand when Ken (then 10 years old) selflessly picked up his father's Magnum. Now, he escapes from prison again and hacks a Workbot (a construction work robot), causing panic in the city.

Owner of the Barox Racing Team. Behind the scenes, he runs an illegal gambling ring with many cyborg racers, including John Maxon.

The Rheinmetall brothers are world-famous commercial kidnappers. They kidnap Jun and demand two masterpieces owned by the Zaizen conglomerate as ransom. Otto is caught up in Id's plan to take advantage of the kidnapping and kill Jun, and dies. Herman, who is left behind, decides to take revenge.

He is a classmate of Chief Jōgasaki and is now a senior officer of the Metropolitan Police Department. He proposes a disciplinary dismissal for Ken, who disappears whenever there is an incident. Behind the scenes, however, he is a corrupt police officer who has been smuggling robot weapons for the past 18 years. Detective Tokimura, his colleague at the time, senses his true identity and eliminates him.

Ultra-thugs wanted by Interpol for murder and robbery, among countless other crimes. Being super-accelerated cyborgs with far more power and speed than Metal Jack, the youngest brother, Nicola, was killed when a momentary gap created by Shadow's intervention was exploited just before Silver's murder. The breakage of the eye shield exposes Ryō's true identity, and the gang begins a war of revenge.

Equipment

The bracelet worm by each member of Metal Jack, which they used to summon the Jack Suits and the Jack Armors. They also function as wireless communicators. The devices featured the Armored Police emblem stored in a compartment inside, which the team used to get a free pass during investigations. The Jack Brace used by Shadow is an older model full of scratches and equipped with a volume knob, and unlike the Jack Braces used by the main three heroes, it is not adorned with any emblem.

The primary armor of the Metal Jacks, equipped during the initial phases of an investigation or a battle. They are transmitted unto the wearer's body through a Jack Brace through the command "Suit On!". The suits are all equipped with a small compression cylinder which allows for better evasive movement and the inhaling of gas.

A rescue tool used by the team when wearing the Jack Suits, its primary function is to save people's lives. In Episode 4, it was used to cut the cable of a shutter in order to rescue a group of people trapped inside a building. It also has the ability to clean up rubble.

A patrol car with the capability of flight. It is used by both, the Metal Jacks and the regular police.

The standard-issue sidearm of the Metal Jacks. It can be transformed into a rifle by setting the long barrel that is folded underneath the standard barrel. This gimmick was carried over to the toy version, which changes the sound effect caused by the toy gun. The toy version was re-released as part of the Brave Police J-Decker toyline.

A nightstick-like weapon used by the Metal Jacks.  The sticks can be covered with energy that allows them to be used as swords.

Jack Armors
The  are the secondary equipment of the Metal Jacks, which are wore over the Jack Suits when facing an extremely dangerous threat. They are transmitted unto the Jack Suits by the Jack Braces when the command "Jack On!" is given. The Jack Armors are actually support robots or vehicles that are dismantled into upper and lower armor, as well as weapons when they transform. When wearing a Jack Armor, the wearer's uncovered portions will not suffer damage even if the armors are destroyed. However, due to the fact that the armors are neurally linked to their bodies, their arms will sustain injuries if they carry too much load.

Ken's armor. It is transformed from Ken's robotic dog companion called . Lander is usually colored black like other robotic dogs, but turns red when Ken transforms into his Jack Suit (Lander's weight also increases and some of his details are changed). It is also equipped with a beam gun on its helmet.

Ryo's armor. Its firearm is called the 

Go's armor. Both of its shoulders are equipped with homing missile launchers.

Shadow's armor. It is transformed from a special security robot called . Shadow can only wear the armor for a limited since it was originally an experimental prototype developed military. As a safety mechanism, it is automatically unequipped when the wearer has used for five minutes. It is equipped with numerous weapons such as missile launchers from chests and front shoulders and cannon from its back shoulders.

A new type of armor that was developed in preparations with the ever-increasing strength of Id's forces. It is eventually made into a second Jack Armor worn by Ken. Although it is highly efficient, Ken must carry on an even greater amount of weight than his regular Red Jack Armor.

Others

A new type of armor worn by Troidal that was developed by Gilria to defeat the Metal Jack. Despite its similarities to the Jack Armors, it was never released as a toy.

List of episodes

Merchandise

Toys
Takara released a set of action figures based on the show under a line called the "Armored Police Series". Each set came packaged with an action figure and a robotic partner or vehicle that could transform into powered suits worn by the figures. The available sets were Red Jack Armor, Silver Jack Armor, Blue Jack Armor, Shadow Jack Armor and Hyper Red Jack Armor. Model kits were also released of the five Jack Armors called the "Jack On Collection". Other toys were released by Takara, including toy versions of the Jack Chaser, Jack Braces and Buster Shot.

Soundtracks
A CD single (Hold On), two albums (Just Dream On and PARTY JACK) and two drama CDs (Count Down and HARD PLAY) were released by King Records.
 Armored Police Metal Jack: Hold On (KIDA-18, 1991/05/05)
 Armored Police Metal Jack: Count Down (KICA-63, 1991/07/16)
 Armored Police Metal Jack: HARD PLAY (KICA-67, 1991/10/21)
 Armored Police Metal Jack: Just Dream On (KICA-86, 1992/02/05)
 Armored Police Metal Jack: PARTY JACK (KICA-103 1992/04/04)

Video games
 Armored Police Metal Jack - Released by Takara for the Game Boy on January 8, 1992. It is a turn-based tactical game that loosely follows the series' storyline. It was developed by KID.
 Armored Police Metal Jack - Released by Atlus for the Super Famicom on July 31, 1992. It is a side-scrolling action game. A North American version was planned but later cancelled, with the story's setting changed from Tokyo to Los Angeles. The heroes' names were also changed from Ken Kanzaki, Ryō Aguri and Gō Gōda to Ken Striker, Billy Crash and Jake Gonzales respectively. Id's name was changed to CRASS.

Home video
The series was gradually released on VHS and Laserdisc following its original airing by King Records. Ten volumes were released in total, with four episodes each for the first eight volumes, three episodes for Vol. 9 and two episodes and a special interview for Vol. 10. A later DVD set of all 37 episodes was released in Japan by King Records on June 7, 2006 to commemorate the show's 15th anniversary.

Books
 Metal Jack Mini Mook, published by Movic Co. Ltd. on September 1, 1992. It is the only mook based on the series. The pages of animation model sheets include line drawings, detailed traits of each character, and specifications of each mecha. It also includes a newly written short story "ONCE MORE AGAIN" (written by Tsukiko Arata and illustrated by Shiomi Koohara), which describes an episode that falls in the interval of the TV series.
 Armored Police Metal Jack, a two-volume novel written by head writer Hiroyuki Kasawaki and published by Tairiku Shobo in 1992. It features some differences in plot developments from the TV series, such as Id collapsing in the first volume and Shadow appearing only in the second volume. In addition, none of the Jack Armors appear on the cover, frontispieces, or in any of the illustrations in the text.

References

External links
Armored Police Metal Jack at Sunrise
Armored Police Metal Jack DVD website 

1991 anime television series debuts
1992 video games
Atlus games
Bandai Namco franchises
Beat 'em ups
Game Boy games
Game Boy-only games
Japan-exclusive video games
KID games
Science fiction anime and manga
Sunrise (company)
Super Nintendo Entertainment System games
Super Nintendo Entertainment System-only games
Takara video games
Video games based on anime and manga
Video games developed in Japan
Video games set in the 2010s
Video games set in Tokyo